Never Ending Story is a 2012 South Korean romantic comedy film directed by Jung Yong-joo. Uhm Tae-woong and Jung Ryeo-won star as a mismatched couple who meet at a hospital where they have both been diagnosed with terminal illnesses and decide to spend the rest of their lives together. Kross Pictures remade the movie in Vietnamese in 2018 as 100 Days of Sunshine.

Plot
Oh Song-kyung (Jung Ryeo-won) is a well-organized 28-year-old bank teller. She meticulously has a plan for everything, including getting married through a dating agency. Taekwondo master Kang Dong-joo's (Uhm Tae-woong) biggest pleasure is buying lottery tickets in hopes of one day hitting the jackpot. In reality, however, he's an incompetent young man who barely makes ends meet and mooches off his younger brother (Park Ki-woong). He is forced to register with a dating agency because of pressure from his sister-in-law (Yoo Sun), who wants to kick him out of their house.

They are the polar opposites of each other, but a few days after registering with the agency, they meet at a hospital where they have both been diagnosed with brain cancer and given just three months to live. When their doctor's appointments bring them into regular contact, the two fall in love and decide to live their remaining days together. With time running out, together they prepare for the last ceremonies of their lives: their funeral, by shopping for coffins, urns and burial clothes and chambers, as well as wedding plans.

Cast
 Uhm Tae-woong as Kang Dong-joo 
 Jung Ryeo-won as Oh Song-kyung
 Park Ki-woong as Dong-joo's brother 
 Yoo Sun as Je-soo, Dong-joo's sister-in-law
 Lee Byung-joon as Mr. Perm 
 Kwon Hae-hyo as Doctor
 Choi Eun-ju as Jin-joo  
 Lee Kan-hee as Jin-joo's aunt
 Park Soo-yong as Jin-joo's boyfriend
 Cha Hwa-yeon as Song-kyung's mother
 Park Yong-shik as Happiness House director
 Park Sung-kwang as matchmaking head
 Ahn Hye-kyung as matchmaking firm president
 Cha Tae-hyun as Song-kyung's friend (cameo)
 Ma Dong-seok as Tow car driver (cameo)

Reception
Though the film's box office was only 275,000 admissions domestically, it was sold to Indonesia and Thailand. It also won the Grand Prize at the Fukuoka Asian Film Festival, established by Japanese director Shōhei Imamura in 1987.

References

External links
   
 
 
 

2012 films
South Korean romantic comedy films
2010s South Korean films